WLMU (91.3 FM) is a radio station licensed to Harrogate, Tennessee, United States.  The station is owned by Lincoln Memorial University.

References

External links

LMU
LMU